The men's 1500 metres at the 2012 IAAF World Indoor Championships took place 9 and 10 March at the Ataköy Athletics Arena.

Medalists

Records

Qualification standards

Schedule

Results

Heats
Qualification: First 3 of each heat (Q) plus 3 fastest times qualified (q). The qualification round started at 12:59 and ended at 13:10.

Final
9 athletes from 7 countries participated. The final started at 19:01 and ended at 19:05.

References

1500 metres
1500 metres at the World Athletics Indoor Championships